Electoral history of Bob Dole, United States Senator from Kansas (1969–1996), Senate Majority Leader (1985–1987, 1995–1996), Senate Minority Leader (1987–1995), 1976 Republican Party vice presidential nominee and 1996 presidential nominee.

He had been involved in many elections on regional, statewide and nationwide stage, from 1950 to 1996.

NOTE: Dole was an incumbent in abolished 6th district and Breeding in 1st district, which became merged into one.

1976 Republican National Convention (Vice Presidential tally):
 Bob Dole - 1,921 (85.04%)
 Abstaining - 103 (4.56%)
 Jesse Helms - 103 (4.56%)
 Ronald Reagan - 27 (1.20%)
 Phil Crane - 23 (1.02%)
 John Grady - 19 (0.84%)
 Louis Frey - 9 (0.40%)
 Anne Armstrong - 6 (0.27%)
 Howard Baker - 6 (0.27%)
 William F. Buckley - 4 (0.18%)
 John B. Connally - 4 (0.18%)
 David C. Treen - 4 (0.18%)
 Alan Steelman - 3 (0.13%)
 Edmund Bauman - 2 (0.09%)
 Bill Brock - 2 (0.09%)
 Paul Laxalt - 2 (0.09%)
 Elliot Richardson - 2 (0.09%)
 Richard Schweiker - 2 (0.09%)
 William E. Simon - 2 (0.09%)
 Jack Wellborn - 2 (0.09%)
 James Allen - 1 (0.04%)
 Ray Barnhardt - 1 (0.04%)
 George H. W. Bush - 1 (0.04%)
 Pete Domenici - 1 (0.04%)
 James B. Edwards - 1 (0.04%)
 Frank S. Glenn - 1 (0.04%)
 David Keane - 1 (0.04%)
 James McClure - 1 (0.04%)
 Nancy Palm - 1 (0.04%)
 Donald Rumsfeld - 1 (0.04%)
 John W. Sears - 1 (0.04%)
 Roger Staubach - 1 (0.04%)
 Steve Symms - 1 (0.04%)

NOTE: One Faithless Elector voted for Reagan instead of Ford, but did cast vice-presidential vote for Dole.

1980 Republican presidential primaries:
 Ronald Reagan - 7,709,793 (59.79%)
 George H. W. Bush - 3,070,033 (23.81%)
 John B. Anderson - 1,572,174 (12.19%)
 Howard Baker - 181,153 (1.41%)
 Phil Crane - 97,793 (0.76%)
 John B. Connally - 82,625 (0.64%)
 Unpledged - 68,155 (0.53%)
 Ben Fernandez - 68,155 (0.53%)
 Harold Stassen - 25,425 (0.20%)
 Gerald Ford - 10,557 (0.08%)
 Bob Dole - 7,204 (0.06%)

Senate Majority Leader, 1984:

Final fourth ballot:
 Bob Dole - 28
 Ted Stevens - 25

Other defeated candidates: Pete Domenici, Dick Lugar, Jim McClure

Iowa Republican presidential Straw Poll, 1987:
 Pat Robertson - 1,293 (33.65%)
 Bob Dole - 958 (24.93%)
 George H. W. Bush - 864 (22.48%)
 Jack Kemp - 520 (13.53%)
 Pierre S. du Pont, IV - 160 (4.16%)
 Ben Fernandez - 23 (0.60%)
 Kate Heslop - 13 (0.34%)
 Alexander Haig - 12 (0.31%)

1988 Republican presidential primaries:
 George H. W. Bush - 8,258,512 (67.91%)
 Bob Dole - 2,333,375 (19.19%)
 Pat Robertson - 1,097,446 (9.02%)
 Jack Kemp - 331,333 (2.72%)
 Unpledged - 56,990 (0.47%)
 Pierre S. du Pont, IV - 49,783 (0.41%)
 Alexander Haig - 26,619 (0.22%)
 Harold Stassen - 2,682 (0.02%)

Iowa Republican presidential Straw Poll, 1995:
 Bob Dole - 2,582 (24.38%)
 Phil Gramm - 2,582 (24.38%)
 Pat Buchanan - 1,922 (18.15%)
 Lamar Alexander - 1,156 (10.91%)
 Alan Keyes - 804 (7.59%)
 Morry Taylor - 803 (7.58%)
 Richard Lugar - 466 (4.40%)
 Pete Wilson - 123 (1.16%)
 Bob Dornan - 87 (0.82%)
 Arlen Specter - 67 (0.63%)

1996 New Hampshire Republican Vice Presidential primary:

All candidates were running as write-in

 Colin Powell - 6,414 (25.80%)
 Alan Keres - 4,200 (16.90%)
 Scattering - 2,631 (10.58%)
 Lamar Alexander - 2,113 (8.50%)
 Richard Lugar - 1,881 (7.57%)
 Phil Gramm - 1,314 (5.29%)
 Steve Forbes - 1,220 (4.91%)
 Pat Buchanan - 1,115 (4.49%)
 Jack Kemp - 970 (3.90%)
 Bob Dole - 930 (3.74%)
 Morry Taylor - 710 (2.86%)
 Al Gore (inc.) - 654 (2.63%)
 Bob Dornan - 401 (1.61%)
 Ross Perot - 108 (0.43%)
 Bill Clinton - 70 (0.28%)
 Ralph Nader - 69 (0.28%)
 Richard P. Bosa - 60 (0.24%)

Washington Presidential primary for independent voters, 1996:
 Bill Clinton (D) (inc.) - 227,120 (51.08%)
 Bob Dole (R) - 125,154 (28.15%)
 Pat Buchanan (R) - 44,027 (9.90%)
 Steve Forbes (R) - 28,618 (6.44%)
 Alan Keyes (R) - 6,631 (1.49%)
 Lamar Alexander (R) - 5,181 (1.17%)
 Lyndon LaRouche (D) - 3,160 (0.71%)
 Richard Lugar (R) - 2,009 (0.45%)
 Phil Gramm (R) - 1,665 (0.37%)
 Bob Dornan (R) - 1,054 (0.24%)

1996 Republican presidential primaries
 Bob Dole - 9,024,742 (58.82%)
 Pat Buchanan - 3,184,943 (20.76%)
 Steve Forbes - 1,751,187 (11.41%)
 Lamar Alexander - 495,590 (3.23%)
 Alan Keyes - 471,716 (3.08%)
 Richard Lugar - 127,111 (0.83%)
 Unpledged delegates - 123,278 (0.80%)
 Phil Gramm - 71,456 (0.47%)
 Bob Dornan - 42,140 (0.28%)
 Morry Taylor - 21,180 (0.14%)
 Others - 18,261 (0.12%)

1996 Republican National Convention (Presidential tally):
 Bob Dole - 1,928 (97.62%)
 Pat Buchanan - 43 (2.18%)
 Phil Gramm - 2 (0.10%)
 Robert Bork - 1 (0.05%)
 Alan Keyes - 1 (0.05%)

References

Dole, Bob
Bob Dole